The spouse of the mayor of Honolulu is an unpaid ceremonial position. Those who have filled the position have been a reflection of the history of the islands. Several were of Hawaiian ancestry. Emma Fern was a Hawaiian chanter and dancer. Kini Kapahu Wilson was not only a proponent of women's voting suffrage, but also found fame as a hula dancer who performed for heads of state around the world.

Where Hawaiian ancestry was involved, including the cultural tradition of informal adoption known as hānai, some of the spouses were known by more than one name in addition to their married names. The practice itself, sometimes described as the Hawaiian foster care system, blurs the accuracy of how many children in a family are the issue of either parent, or fostered into the family. For that reason, obituaries often varied from source to source in reporting the number of children of the deceased.

So far, Eileen Anderson has been the only woman mayor, and her husband Clifford F. Anderson was retired from his position as an officer with the Honolulu Police Department when she ran for office. Mayor Frank Fasi married Cherry Blossom Queen contestant Joyce Kono. Lucy Thurston Blaisdell was a school teacher for decades, and Gail Mukaihata Hanneman served as a United States congressional staffer or years, before returning to Hawaii when her husband ran for mayor. Donna Tanoue has a background in financial investment, has served on several corporate boards, and earned her J.D. from the Georgetown University Law Center.

Spouses of the mayors of Honolulu

See also
 Spouses of the Governors of Hawaii

References

Bibliography

External links
 

Government of Honolulu
First ladies and gentlemen of Honolulu